Huang Zuoshen (1915 – 1975; also: Henry Huang; Henry Wong; Huang Zuoxin) was a pioneer of modern architecture in China.

Huang attended the School of the Architectural Association in London from 1933 to 1937, and followed Walter Gropius in 1939 to the United States to study at Harvard University, instead of taking an offer from Le Corbusier of an internship in his studio.

He returned to China in 1942, after being invited to found the Department of Architecture at St. John's University in Shanghai – where his teachings would be first in the country to follow the Bauhaus School. He also helped establish a practice  called Five United, which was a disparate group of Chinese architects who had mostly studied at British universities. The others in the group were Wang Da-hong, Chen Chan-siang, Luke Him Sau and Arthur Kun-Shuan Cheang.

Huang emphasised Functionalism and Modernism in his teachings at St. John's University, and was later Director of the Department of Architecture at Tongji University from 1952 to 1954.

References 

Chinese architects
1915 births
1975 deaths
Harvard Graduate School of Design alumni
Alumni of the Architectural Association School of Architecture
Academic staff of Tongji University

zh:黄作燊